Lillhaga is a locality situated in Ljusdal Municipality, Gävleborg County, Sweden with 379 inhabitants in 2010.

References 

Populated places in Ljusdal Municipality
Hälsingland